This article pertains to the team squads of Men's Football at the 2000 Summer Olympics.

Normally, the squads consisted of 18 roster players, with the addition of three or four reserve players. These players were added to the squad in accordance with FIFA regulations (i.e. player injury).

Overage players are marked with *.

Group A

Australia
Head coach:  Raúl Blanco

Stand-by players

Honduras
Head coach:  Ramón Maradiaga

Stand-by players

Italy
Head coach: Marco Tardelli

Stand-by players

Nigeria
Head coach:  Jo Bonfrere

Stand-by players

Group B

Chile
Head coach:  Nelson Acosta

Héctor Tapia was replaced and did not receive a medal.
Stand-by players

Morocco
Head coach: Said El-Khider

Stand-by players

Spain
Head coach: Iñaki Sáez

Stand-by players

South Korea
Head coach:  Huh Jung-moo

Stand-by players

Group C

Cameroon
Head Coach: Jean-Paul Akono

Stand-by players

Czech Republic
Head coach: Karel Brückner

Stand-by players

Kuwait
Head coach:  Radojko Avramović

Stand-by players

United States
Head coach:  Clive Charles

Stand-by players

Group D

Brazil
Head coach: Vanderlei Luxemburgo

Stand-by players

Japan
Head coach:  Philippe Troussier

Stand-by players

Slovakia
Head coach: Dušan Radolský

Stand-by players

South Africa
Head Coach: Ephraim Mashaba

Stand-by players

Footnotes

External links
FIFA.com

2000 Summer Olympics Men's
Football at the 2000 Summer Olympics